Quintero is a Spanish surname originating in the Spanish region of Galicia. The name comes from quinto or quinta which means "fifth". It is possible that a "quintero" was a renter of quintas (also known as haciendas, the Spanish equivalent to a ranch). The quintero would rent one-fifth of the land and pay as rent one-fifth of his produce of the land to the landlord.

Others have suggested, not dissimilarly, that the surname is habitational, derived from a place called Quintero in Ourense province, so named from quinteiro, meaning "farmstead".

Notable people
Alejandra Quintero (born 1976), Mexican beauty pageant contestant
Armando Quintero Martínez (born 1954), Mexican politician
Gabriela Quintero (born 1973), Mexican musician of Rodrigo y Gabriela
Hannelly Quintero (born 1985), Venezuelan model and presenter
Humberto Quintero (born 1979), Venezuelan baseball player
Ioamnet Quintero (born 1972), Cuban high jumper
José Quintero (1924–1999), Panamanian theater director and teacher
José Quintero Parra (1902–1984), Venezuelan cardinal
José Agustín Quintero (1829–1885), Cuban journalist revolutionary
Juan Fernando Quintero (born 1993), Colombian footballer
Luis Manuel Quintero (1725? – 1810) One of the 44 original settlers of the Pueblo de Los Angeles
Quintero brothers, Spanish dramatists:
Hermanos Álvarez Quintero (1871–1938)
Joaquín Álvarez Quintero (1873–1944)
Rafael Caro Quintero (born 1952), Mexican drug lord
Cristóbal Quintero  (1450 -1503) a native of Palos de la Frontera, Spain,. Navigator and Spanish explorer who participated in the discovery of America. He sailed with Christopher Columbus on his first three voyages and was an owner of the ship "La Pinta", one of the three ships sailed in the discovery of America in 1492.

Related surnames

Quintana
Quinteros
Quinto

References

External links
art-marble.com - list of Surnames

Spanish-language surnames